Real Unión Club, S.A.D. is a Spanish football club based in Irun, in the autonomous community of the Basque Country, in the province of Gipuzkoa, near the border with France. Founded on 15 May 1915 it currently plays in Primera División RFEF – Group 2, holding home matches at the 5,000-seater Stadium Gal. Real Unión was one of the founding members of La Liga in 1929. The club spent four seasons in the Spanish elite, suffering relegation in 1932. Real is yet to return to the top tier, spending the rest of its history bouncing between the second and fourth tiers of Spanish football.

History

Real Unión were among the early pioneering Spanish football teams and, along with fellow Basque clubs Athletic Bilbao, Real Sociedad and Arenas Club de Getxo were founding members of La Liga, in 1928.
The club was formed in 1915 following the merger of Irún Sporting Club and Racing Club de Irún. The former was founded in 1902 as Irún Foot-Ball Club, changing its name in 1907. The latter, formed in 1908, had already won the 1913 Copa del Rey, beating Athletic Bilbao 1–0 in a replayed final. The club was briefly known as Unión Club Irún before Alfonso XIII gave the club royal approval, but during the Second Spanish Republic the club reverted to this name.

Real Unión then won the Copa del Rey a further three times, beating Real Madrid in 1918 and again in 1924 (with former Derby County and England striker Steve Bloomer acting as their coach). In 1927 they defeated Arenas Getxo in the first all-Basque final. The latter two finals both ended in 1–0 victories, with José Echeveste netting the winner on both occasions. In 1922 they were runners-up, losing 5–1 to FC Barcelona. In 1930 they participated in the Coupe des Nations in Geneva, Switzerland, a predecessor of the UEFA Champions League since the champions of all major European football nations were invited, although it has never been entirely clear why Unión was invited as they had finished sixth in the 1929–30 La Liga. Nonetheless, they were eliminated in the quarter-finals by Slavia Prague. The club was relegated from La Liga in 1932.

In 1920, when Spain made their international debut at the Olympic Games, the club provided the squad with two players—Eguiazábal and Patricio, the latter scoring Spain's first-ever goal in international football in a 1–0 victory over Denmark on 28 August 1920. Another Real Unión player, René Petit, took part in the same Olympic Games with France. In the 70s and 80s, Spanish internationals Javier Irureta and Roberto López Ufarte began their career with the club.

On 11 November 2008, in the 2008–09 Copa del Rey against Real Madrid, Real Unión lost 3–4 at the Santiago Bernabéu, but secured a famous aggregate victory following a 3–2 home victory in the first leg (away goals rule). It was the first time in history that Real Madrid were eliminated by a Segunda División B team at home.

The club finally returned to the Segunda División in 2009 after a 44-year absence, successively defeating CE Sabadell FC (2–1 aggregate) and AD Alcorcón (3–1) in the 2008–09 promotion play-offs. However, it would be a short-lived return, as the team was immediately relegated, after ranking 21st.

Season to season

 4 seasons in La Liga
10 seasons in Segunda División
2 seasons in Primera División RFEF
27 seasons in Segunda División B
40 seasons in Tercera División
 7 seasons in Categorías Regionales

Current squad
.

Reserve team

Out of loan

Honours
Copa del Rey: Winners (4) 1913, 1918, 1924, 1927
Runners-up: 1922 
Copa Federación de España: Winners 2014–15
Segunda División B: Winners: 2002–03, 2008–09
Tercera División: Winners1957–58, 1963–64; 1991–92, 1992–93
North Regional Championship: Winners 1917–18
Gipuzkoa Championship: Winners (8) 1919–20, 1920–21, 1921–22, 1923–24, 1925–26, 1927–28, 1929–30, 1930–31
RFEF Basque tournament: Winners 1998–99, 2014–15

International
Tournoi de Pâques de l'Olympique de Pantin
Winners: 1922
Tournoi de Pentecôte de Paris Football Latin
Winners: 1923
Tournoi "Stade Buffalo" de Paris
Runners-up: 1930

Notes

Famous players
Note: players that have reached international status.

Former coaches
 Steve Bloomer
 Javier Zubillaga

References

External links
Official website 
Futbolme team profile 

 
Football clubs in the Basque Country (autonomous community)
Association football clubs established in 1915
Copa del Rey winners
Irun
1915 establishments in Spain
Sport in Gipuzkoa
U
Segunda División clubs
La Liga clubs
Primera Federación clubs